The bay-vented cotinga (Doliornis sclateri) is a species of bird in the family Cotingidae.
It is endemic to Peru.

Its natural habitats are subtropical or tropical moist montane forests and subtropical or tropical high-altitude grassland.
It is threatened by habitat loss.

Identification
Males have a black crown and nape (with partially concealed red crests), and are dark brown above and paler brown below, with reddish brown tail-coverts and grey throat and sides of head and neck. Female are similar, but lack black crown.

References

External links
BirdLife Species Factsheet. 

bay-vented cotinga
Birds of the Peruvian Andes
Endemic birds of Peru
bay-vented cotinga
bay-vented cotinga
Taxonomy articles created by Polbot